John Phillips (born 1981) is a sport scientist from England. He is currently the Head of Sport Science at Queens Park Rangers Football Club. He has previously worked as Head of Academy Sports Science and Medicine at QPR, Head of Sport Science at Al Ahli (Dubai) and Head of Sport Science at Malmö FF (Sweden). Prior to this, John worked for Southampton FC for 6 years as a sport scientist and assisted the England U17 National Team at tournaments as well as presenting for the Football League. He also worked with female England players providing S&C and sport science support.

Phillips is educated to BSc level in Sport and Exercise Science and has an MSc in Physiology. He has recently begun his PhD focusing on training load in football. He is the co-author of two books (The Cheetah and the Athlete and The Neuromuscular Diamonds).

References

External links
Malmö FF Profile

1981 births
Living people
English football managers
English male kickboxers